The 1959 Appalachian State Mountaineers football team was an American football team that represented Appalachian State Teachers College (now known as Appalachian State University) as a member of the North State Conference during the 1959 NAIA football season. In their only year under head coach Bob Breitenstein, the Mountaineers compiled an overall record of 6–4, with a mark of 5–1 in conference play, and finished second in the NSC.

Schedule

References

Appalachian State
Appalachian State Mountaineers football seasons
Appalachian State Mountaineers football